Mason Walters is an American football offensive lineman and is a graduate from the University of Texas at Austin. Walters is considered one of the best offensive guard prospects of his class.

Walters currently works as a Senior Analyst for Realized Holdings in Austin, Texas.

High school career
Walters attended Frenship High School in Wolfforth, Texas, where he was a two-time all-state and three-time all-district offensive lineman and helped the team to a 48-9 record (17-1 in district play). He was named a 2008 High School All-American by USA Today and Parade.

Regarded as a five-star recruit by Rivals.com, Walters was listed as the No. 2 offensive tackle prospect of the class of 2009.

College career
He appeared in one game at tackle in his first year at Texas, but than missed the remainder of the season with a foot injury and was granted a medical redshirt. In his redshirt freshman year, he started five games at right guard and appeared on special teams.

References

External links
Texas Longhorns bio

Texas Longhorns football players
American football offensive guards
People from Plainview, Texas
Living people
1990s births
Date of birth missing (living people)